Keora may refer to:

 Plants in the genus Pandanus
 Keora, Ghana, Nzérékoré Prefecture, Ghana
 Keora caste, India

See also
 Kia ora (disambiguation)